4789 Sprattia, provisional designation , is a stony background asteroid from the inner regions of the asteroid belt, approximately  in diameter. It was discovered on 20 October 1987, by Canadian astronomer David Balam at the Climenhaga Observatory  in Victoria, Canada. The S-type asteroid has a rotation period of 3.1 hours and was named after Canadian amateur astronomer Christopher E. Spratt.

Orbit and classification 

Sprattia is a non-family asteroid from the main belt's background population. It orbits the Sun in the inner asteroid belt at a distance of 2.0–2.5 AU once every 3 years and 4 months (1,223 days; semi-major axis of 2.24 AU). Its orbit has an eccentricity of 0.12 and an inclination of 1° with respect to the ecliptic.

Physical characteristics 

Sprattia has been characterized as a common, stony S-type asteroid by Pan-STARRS and the Sloan Digital Sky Survey.

Rotation period 

In December 2011, a rotational lightcurve of Sprattia was obtained from photometric observations in the R-band by astronomers at the Palomar Transient Factory in California. Lightcurve analysis gave a rotation period of 3.136 hours with a brightness amplitude of 0.17 magnitude.

Diameter and albedo 

According to the survey carried out by the NEOWISE mission of NASA's Wide-field Infrared Survey Explorer, Sprattia measures between 3.54 and 4.172 kilometers in diameter and its surface has an albedo between 0.28 and 0.44.

The Collaborative Asteroid Lightcurve Link assumes a standard albedo for a stony asteroid of 0.20, and calculates a diameter of 4.22 kilometers based on an absolute magnitude of 14.24.

Naming 

This minor planet was named after Canadian amateur astronomer Christopher E. Spratt (born 1942), a long-time member of the Royal Astronomical Society of Canada, whose interests involve comets, minor planets, meteors and variable stars. The official naming citation was published by the Minor Planet Center on 27 June 1991.

References

External links 
 Asteroid Lightcurve Database (LCDB), query form (info )
 Dictionary of Minor Planet Names, Google books
 Discovery Circumstances: Numbered Minor Planets (1)-(5000) – Minor Planet Center
 
 

004789
Discoveries by David D. Balam
Named minor planets
19871020